Silicon oxide may refer to either of the following:

Silicon dioxide or quartz, SiO2, very well characterized
Silicon monoxide, SiO, not very well characterized